Fabrício Silva Costa (born 3 August 1998), known as Fabrício Bigode, is a Brazilian footballer who currently plays as a midfielder.

Career
Fabrício Bigode was loaned out from Sport Recife to Guarani for the 2018 season. After the loan spell ended, the club announced that the player had resigned from his contract with Sport Recife, to join Guarani permanently on a contract until 2020.

On 4 July 2019, Danish club Vejle Boldklub announced that they had signed Fabrício Bigode and immediately loaned him out to Latvian club FK Ventspils.

Career statistics

Club

Notes

References

1998 births
Living people
Brazilian footballers
Association football midfielders
Campeonato Brasileiro Série A players
Campeonato Brasileiro Série B players
Sport Club do Recife players
Guarani FC players
Vejle Boldklub players
FK Ventspils players
Associação Portuguesa de Desportos players